Tope puestero is the third album by the Argentine singer Jorge Cafrune, released in Argentina in 1962.

Track listing
"Tope puestero"
"La yapita"
"Camino de los quileros"
"Zamba de Oran"
"Fule Mandinga"
"En mi valle de Punilla"
"Anocheciendo zambas"
"Salto Grande"
"Canción al regreso"
"Chasca habia sido"
"Atardecer de primavera"
"Como yo lo siento"

Jorge Cafrune albums
1962 albums